WJRX-LP was a Religious formatted broadcast radio station licensed to Williamsburg, Virginia, serving the immediate Williamsburg area.  WJRX-LP was owned and operated by Christian Life Center.

History
WJRX-LP signed on on January 27, 2003.  The station launched the first translator station for a low-power station on March 16, 2004 when W271AK signed on from Grove, Virginia.  The translator broadcast on 102.1.

Christian Life Center surrendered both licenses in April 2008.  No reason for the surrender was ever given.

External links
 

JRX-LP
Defunct radio stations in the United States
JRX-LP
Radio stations established in 2003
Defunct religious radio stations in the United States
Radio stations disestablished in 2008
2003 establishments in Virginia
2008 disestablishments in Virginia
JRX-LP